Gordonia hirsuta is a bacterium from the genus Gordonia which has been isolated from a biofilter of an animal rendering plant in Germany.

References

Further reading

External links 
Type strain of Gordonia hirsuta at BacDive -  the Bacterial Diversity Metadatabase

Mycobacteriales
Bacteria described in 1996